Coritiba Foot Ball Club, commonly known as Coritiba and colloquially referred to as "Coxa", is a Brazilian football club from Curitiba, capital city of the Brazilian state of Paraná. Founded in 1909 by German immigrants, it is the oldest football club in the state. Coritiba have won the Paraná State Championship 39 times – more than both of its main rivals combined (Athletico Paranaense have 26 titles and Paraná Clube have 7). Coritiba has won the Brazilian Championship once in 1985.

Coritiba is the first club from southern Brazil to have won a national title, the 1973 Torneio do Povo, and is also the first southern club to have competed in both main continental competitions – the Copa Libertadores and the Copa Sudamericana. Coritiba was both the first club from Paraná to have won the Série A (the main title in Brazil), and to reach the semi-finals in the second main competition in the country – the Copa do Brasil – in 1991, 2001, 2009, and to reach the finals in 2011 and 2012.

Coritiba is the only club who have six consecutive Paranaense titles, between 1971 and 1976.  Coritiba is also the club with the most appearances in this championship.

The club are currently in first place on the FPF ranking, 14th place on the CBF ranking, 83rd place on the Conmebol ranking and 125th on the international IFFHS ranking. The club has more than 30,000 members.

As of 2013, Coritiba has partnerships (including loans and exchanges of youth players) with Porto and Benfica of Portugal, Chivas Guadalajara of Mexico, Daegu of South Korea and VVV-Venlo of the Netherlands. Coritiba is the first football club in the south of Brazil to begin to embrace American football. The american football team Coritiba Crocodiles were formed through a fusion between Coritiba (american football) and the Barigui Crocodiles, and are three times Brazilian champions, nine times state champions and have twice won the southern conference.

History

Foundation

In 1909, a group of young men met in the Clube Ginástico Teuto-Brasileiro Turnverein (German-Brazilian Gymnastics Club Turnverein – "Turnverein" being the German word for gymnastics club), where the German immigrant community of Curitiba gathered to play a variety of sports. In July of that year, a prominent member of the club, Frederico "Fritz" Essenfelder arrived with a leather ball in hand. He explained to his friends that it was a football and he explained the rules of this new game. Fritz and his friends within the club started organizing matches in the field of the Quartel da Força Pública (Public Force Headquarters).

Later, an invitation came to play a match against a club of workers, many of them British, from the Ponta Grossa railway. On 12 October 1909, Fritz called a meeting in the old Theatro Hauer (Hauer Theatre) to arrange the first match. A decision was made to form a football club, and he would call it Teuto-Brasileiro. Teuto-Brasileiro would be the first football club in the state of Paraná.

The First Match

On 23 October 1909, in Ponta Grossa, the club had its first official match. The opponents were Clube de Foot Ball de Tiro Pontagrossense, made up of employees from the South American Brazilian Engineering Company. The match was won by Tiro Pontagrossense, with a 1–0 scoreline, the goal being scored by Elias Mota.

Coritiba's team for the first match was: Arthur Iwersen, Erothildes Carlberg, Leopoldo Obladen, Arthur Hauer, Alfredo Labsch, Alfredo Hauer, Walter Dietrich, Teodoro Obladen, Carlos Schleker, Roberto Juchks, Fritz Essenfelder, Johann Maschke, Waldemar Hauer, Alvin Hauer and Rudolf Kaastrup.

Club Foundation

After the match in Ponta Grossa, the club's founders and members were excited by the new game, and decided to dedicate their club exclusively to football. There were already more than 50 players, many of them not of German descent, yet the Clube Ginástico Teuto-Brasileiro Turnverein did not allow non-German members; this led to the formation of a separate club (after many discussions held at Teatro Hauer throughout December 1909). Finally, on 30 January 1910, the independent Coritibano Foot Ball Club was formed. The name was chosen as this is what the team had played as at their first match in Ponta Grossa.

The first club meeting was held 21 April 1910, after they had acquired all of the rules of the sport (from Rio de Janeiro and São Paulo). During this meeting, the first Board of Directors was formed, naming João Viana Seiler as president, Arthur Hauer as vice-president, José Júlio Franco and Leopoldo Obladen as first and second secretary respectively, and Walter Dietrich and Alvim Hauer as first and second treasurer respectively. Fritz was named captain of the team. It was also during this meeting that the name of the club was changed, this time to Coritiba, after the old name of the capital of Paraná. This was to avoid confusion with a social club in the city called Coritibano. The foundation of Coritiba Foot Ball Club effectively launched organized football in the state of Paraná.

1910s and 1920s

The search for a football ground began and the Hipódromo do Guabirotuba (Guabirotuba Horse Racing Track) was chosen. It was also the home of the Jockey Clube do Paraná until 1955. Bleachers were needed to accommodate spectators, and after the new stadium was retrofitted for football, it was named Prado de Guabirotuba. The inauguration took place on 12 June 1910, before a match against Ponta Grossa Foot Ball Club (the new name of Clube de Foot Ball de Tiro Pontagrossense). Coritiba won the match 5–3. It was the first football match in Curitiba and was viewed by 200 spectators. Coritiba went on to play at Prado de Guabirotuba until 1917.

In 1915, Coritiba started competing in both the Campeonato da Cidade (City Championship) and the Campeonato Paranaense state championship. Coritiba won both the city and the state championships the following year. On 2 July 1916, Coritiba defeated a club by the name of Spartano in the Campeonato Paranaense state championship by 7 goals to the opponent's nought. That year, star player José Bermudes – better known as Maxambomba – became the first player from a Paraná team to be selected for the Brazil national squad. Coritiba won the Torneio Afonso Camargo (Afonso Camargo Tournament) and, in 1917, the club started playing at their new stadium Parque da Graciosa in Juvevê, where they played until 1932.

In 1920, Coritiba won the Torneio Início and, in 1921, they won it again along with the Torneio da Cruz Vermelha and the Torneio de Tiradentes. On 15 August 1921, the club beat the São Paulo state team, the Seleção Paulista, 1–0. The São Paulo state team formed the backbone of the Brazil national side, so this victory put football in the State of Paraná on the national map. The forward Maxambomba and the midfielder Gonçalo Pena were both selected for the Brazil national team that played in the 1921 South American Championship (now called the Copa América).

In 1924, the great state rivalry between Coritiba and Clube Atlético Paranaense began. On 8 June of that year, Coritiba beat Atlético 6–3, with four goals by Ninho. On 7 November 1926, Coritiba beat Paraná Sports 13–1, the largest goal difference in the history of the Paraná state championship. Staco scored five goals for Coritiba. In 1927, with Antônio Couto Pereira as president, Coritiba soundly won the Campeonato Paranaense by winning eight of their nine matches. Staco scored seven goals in a 9–0 victory over Savoia. In the same year, the club won both the Campeonato da Cidade and the Taça Fox.

1930s and 1940s
In 1930, Coritiba won the Torneio Início. On 23 November, Coritiba beat their arch-rivals Atlético-PR by 7–4, the highest scoring match in the competition. The following year, Coritiba won the Campeonato Paranaense and the Campeonato da Cidade. In the 1931 edition of the Campeonato Paranaense, history was made during a match against Palestra Itália.

Moaçir Gonçalves was a player-manager for Coritiba and he became the first black player for a team from the state capital. There were many black players in the 1930s in Brazil, but Curitiba was a city dominated demographically by German, Polish and Ukrainian immigrants so black players were rare. With his team trailing 3–1, Moaçir Gonçalves substituted himself in and Coritiba won 5–4.

Another notable character that season was Rei, a young ball boy for Coritiba nicknamed Rei dos Vagabundos (King of Bums) due to his lazy, laid-back attitude. During training for a Sunday match, the regular goalkeeper was late and the coach, Pizzatto, put the sixteen-year-old Fontana in the net. He astonished everyone with his performance and he was promptly registered as a player by the next match. He debuted against Atlético-PR in Baixada, and Coritiba won 1–0. José Fontana was selected as Man of the Match and went on to be known as 'The King'. He became the first goalkeeper from Paraná state to be selected for the national side.

In 1932, Coritiba won both the Torneio Inicio and the Torneio dos Cronista Esportivos. On 7 August 1932, Coritiba beat Atlético-PR 6–1, away from home and with a reserve team. On 19 November, Coritiba inaugurated its new Belfort Duarte stadium. The inaugural match was against América-RJ, a team from Rio who were the defending champions of the Campeonato Carioca, which is the state championship in Rio de Janeiro. Coritiba won 4–2 and began a long period of success, winning many titles including the city's championship, Campeonato da Cidade (1933, 1935 and 1939), the Campeonato Paranaense (1933, 1935 and 1939), the Torneio Arthur Friedenreich (1934) and Torneio Início (1939).

On 23 January 1941, Coritiba played its first match against a foreign team, drawing with Gimnasia y Esgrima La Plata of Argentina at Belfort Duarte. On 1 February 1942, Neno scored seven goals in a 10–2 victory over Jacarezinho. On 18 March, the club played a friendly against Avaí and won 4–1, the first match played at night under floodlights in the state of Paraná. In 1943, Coritiba won both the Torneio Imprensa and the Torneio Luis Aranha. 1944 saw Coritiba win the Torneio Getúlio Vargas and, in the following year, the Torneio da Cidade de Curitiba. During this time Couto Pereira left the presidency of the club after two terms (a total of thirteen years). In 1946 and 1947, won the Campeonato da Cidade and were twice champions in the Campeonato Paranaense. Also in 1947, Coritiba won all four categories of the Campeonato Paranaense (aspirant, amateur, juvenile and professional) and was dubbed Campeoníssimo or 'Super Champion'. On 12 July 1949, Coritiba played its first match against a club from outside of continental America. They beat Rapid Vienna of Austria 4–0 in Vila Capanema. Rapid Vienna was the Austrian national champion at the time.

1950s and 1960s
The 1950s was a successful decade for Coritiba. The club won the Torneio Triangular de Curitiba in 1950, and the Torneio Quadrangular Interestadual and Torneio Quadrangular de Londrina in 1953. They won the Campeonato Paranaense six times: 1951, 1952, 1954, 1956, 1957 and 1959

In 1960, Coritiba won the Campeonato Paranaense again. In that year, the club lost the famous coin game to Grêmio for the title of Taça Brasil. After three draws between the clubs, the title was decided with the flip of a coin. In 1967, Evangelino da Costa Neves became the new president of Coritiba and he stayed at the helm for more than twenty years. On August 6, Coritiba defeated Atlético Madrid of Spain in Belfort Duarte 3–2, with three goals from Walter. On December 12, Coritiba beat the Hungarian national side 1–0 at Belfort Duarte.

In 1968, Coritiba ended a draught of eight years without titles when they became champion of the Campeonato Paranaense, also winning the Torneio Internacional de Verão. On June 2, Coritiba played Napoli of Italy, at Belfort Duarte. On November 13, Coritiba played the Brazilian national team, losing 2–1.

In 1969, Coritiba embarked on its first international tour, playing friendlies in Germany, Austria, Bulgaria, the Netherlands and Belgium, and participating in the III Torneio Cidade de Murcia (III Tournament in Murcia), in Spain. The club won the Pierre Colon Cup in France as well. Coritiba played against the likes of Valencia of Spain, Borussia Dortmund of Germany, Bordeaux of France, Feyenoord of the Netherlands, Austria Vienna of Austria, Levski Sofia of Bulgaria, and Anderlecht of Belgium.

1970s
In 1970, in order to rally their fans and boost their finances for an expansion of the Belfort Duarte Stadium, the president Evangelino adopted the strategy used by rivals Atlético-PR, making some major signings. The first wave included players like Rinaldo (Palmeiras), Joel Mendes (Santos) and Hidalgo (XV de Piracicaba). The club embarked on another international tour, this time playing against clubs in France, Yugoslavia, Algeria, Romania and Portugal, as well as the Algerian national side and Sporting CP. Coritiba won the Torneio Internacional de Verão in 1970 and 1971.

In 1971, Coritiba started what is known as The Golden Decade, winning six consecutive state championships (in 1971, 1972, 1973, 1974, 1975 and 1976) – a record in Parana state football history. On January 18, 1971, Coritiba played the French national side, who had just beaten Argentina, at Belfort Duarte and won 2–1.

In 1972, on a third international tour, the club played friendlies in Algeria and Morocco, and took part in a tournament in Turkey. On this tour, Coritiba played against Fenerbahçe, as well as the national sides of both Turkey and Morocco. Returning undefeated to Coritiba, they received the Fita Azul. In the same year, Coritiba played Benfica from Portugal, and the national sides of both Hungary and Congo at Belfort Duarte.

In 1973, Coritiba won the Torneio do Povo, becoming the first team from southern Brazil to win a national title. On June 18, Coritiba beat the Paraguayan national side 1–0 at Belfort Duarte. Coritiba won the Quadrangular de Goiás in 1975 and Taça Cidade de Curitiba/Taça Clemente Comandulli in 1976 and 1978. In 1977, the name of the Belfort Duarte stadium was changed to Major Antônio Couto Pereira, and, in 1978 and 1979, Coritiba won two Campeonatos Paranaense. The club ended the 1970s with eight state championships and, in 1979, finished third in the national Brasileirão.

1980s
In 1980, Coritiba finished fourth in the Brasileirão, beating both Ferroviário and Desportiva with a 7–1 scoreline. After this, however, Coritiba encountered both an administrative and a financial crisis, leaving the team without any important titles until 1985.

In 1981, the club won a Quadrangular do Trabalhador, and due to the poor campaigns in Campeonato Paranaense, participated in 1981 and 1983 Taça da Prata, the second division of Brasileirão. In 1983, they beat Torneio Ak-Waba, from the Ivory Coast. In this tournament, Coritiba played against the Bulgarian national team twice, because the Bulgarians, not disheartened after losing the first match 2–0, challenged Coritiba for to a rematch. This ended in a 1–1 draw. In 1984, Coritiba moved back to the Brasileirão and took part in Campeonato Brasileiro, finishing in eighth place.

1985 – Brasileirão champion
1985 saw the most glory for football both in Coritiba and Paraná thus far. Discredited, the club, commanded by Ênio Andrade, supplanted the challenges and beat the Brazilian team, winning in penalties against Bangu in Maracanã. Fans of Vasco, Flamengo, Fluminense, and Botafogo attended to support Bangu, totalling more than 91,000 fans.

In the same year as their national title, Coritiba also won the Torneio Maurício Fruet, as well as participating in two friendly games against Cerro Porteño. They drew 0–0 in their first friendly, hosted in Asuncion (Paraguay), but won the second 2–0 in Couto Pereira.

In 1986, Coritiba played Copa Libertadores da America, becoming the first team from the state to win the competition. In this year, Coritiba won the Campeonato Paranaense. In 1987, Coritiba were invited to join Clube dos 13 and participate in Copa União (União Cup).

In 1989, Coritiba won the Campeonato Paranaense. In this year, they played a good campaign in Brasileirão, but refused to agree to a change in the calendar of play which meant the club were to play the day before playing Vasco da Gama – their main opponent in their group. Coritiba therefore did not go to the match against Santos, supposed to be held in Juiz de Fora, and was punished by CBF with an automatic loss of 1–0, the loss of five points and thus fell to Série B. On June 18, Coritiba beat the Japanese national team 1–0 in Couto Pereira.

1990s
In the year of 1990, the drama of the previous year was still being felt. The club entered a new crisis, which eventually spanned the first half of the decade. Nevertheless, Coritiba made a good performance in Copa do Brasil of 1991, reaching the semi-finals. After two years in Série B, in 1992, Coritiba moved once again up a division, falling yet again in 1993. In 1995, with a loss to Matsubara, Evangelino Neves was pressed to leave the club. Édison Mauad, Sérgio Prosdócimo and Joel Malucelli assumed presidency and fought to beat public doubts about the club. They were successful, and Coritiba moved back up to Série A.

In the state competition, however, Coritiba's winning spell was over. They came close in 1995 in an exciting final against rival Paraná (team), but unfortunately Coritiba eventually lost the match, held in Pinheirão, 1–0. The team came close again in 1996, but did not reach the final.

In 1997, Coritiba were the champions of the Festival Brasileiro de Futebol. Although the championship was not as highly regarded as others they had previously won, the club were struggling so the title was very well celebrated by the Coritiba fans. In the next year, January 19, Coritiba won 3–1 in a friendly against the Jamaica national team, who a month later participated in the World Cup. In the 1998 Brasileirão, Coritiba produced a great performance, ending the first phase in third place. In the knockout phase though, they were eliminated by Portugal, ending the competition in sixth place.

In 1999, Coritiba returned to the Campeonato Paranaense, winning after nine years state title hiatus.

2000s
In 2001, Coritiba had a good first semester, becoming vice-champion of Copa Sul-Minas (South-Minas Cup), and reaching the semi-finals of the Copa do Brasil. But in the Campeonato Paranaense, the club were eliminated in the semi-finals, yet again for Paraná state. Fernando Miguel scored a goal for Coritiba in the 93rd minute (48th minute of the second half).

In 2002, after a bad beginning, Coritiba improved throughout the season. They did, however, lose against Gama.

In 2003, as well as being unbeaten champions of Campeonato Paranaense, they were fifth in Brasileirão, and were allowed to play in the Libertadores da América the next year.

In 2004, they won the Campeonato Paranaense again and participated in the Sul-Americanas and Libertadores da América cups.

In 2005, after a bad campaign in the Campeonato Brasileiro, the team fell to Série B of the competition. In that year, Coritiba had the fourth highest average attendance of the tournament, with 18,688 per match.

2006 brought coach Marcio Araújo to Coritiba, and later Estevam Soares. After eliminations from the Campeonato Paranaense and Copa do Brasil, Estevam was fired, and was replaced by Paulo Bonamigo. During Campeonato, Coritiba won a number of rounds, but ended the championship in sixth place, so did not move up to Série A.

In 2007, Guilherme Macuglia was the new boss. He was in command during the Campeonato Paranaense, Copa do Brasil, and for part of the Campeonato Brasileiro. In July 2007, Renê Simões was hired as the new boss after the sacking of Macuglia. During this period, the players were revealed: people like defender Henrique, the midfielders Marlos and Pedro Ken, and striker Keirrison, as well as players such as Gustavo, Túlio and goalkeeper Edson Baston. On November 3, with four games to spare, Coritiba were back up to Série A of Brasileirão, drawing with Vitória, in Couto Pereira. On November 24, in their last game, with a victory against Santa Cruz in Estádio do Arruda (Arruda Stadium), Coritiba were champions of Serie B in 2007.

In 2009, Coritiba fell to Série B after a tie with Fluminense, the result was a sports riot in the stadium that left 18 injured, damages of R$500 thousand and 6 Coritiba fans in prison. But in 2010, Coritiba were back to Série A, and Coritiba did not fall again.

2010s
In 2010, Coritiba won the Campeonato Paranaense, and the Coritiba fans celebrated the title early against their greatest rival with a 2–0 victory in Couto Pereira. There were goals from Marcos Aurélio and Geraldo. During the Campeonato Brasileiro, Coritiba were not the favorite for the title, because they had lost in Couto Pereira for 10 games. When they returned to Couto Pereira they were first in table. They won again on September 18, with a victory of 2–0 against Portuguesa, with 30,414 fans making a big party.

On November 9, 2010, three games early, Coritiba were back to Série A after a 3–2 win against Duque de Caxias in São Januário. On November 20, with a draw against Icasa in Romeirão, Coritiba were champions of Série B one game early.

On April 24, 2011, the club needed only a draw to win the state championship title a game early, and pulled it off: Coritiba were champion of Campeonato Paranaense again, after defeating Atlético Paranaense 3–0, in a game in Arena da Baixada. The two-time state champions were unbeaten, with only two draws.

On April 28, with a 1–0 win against Caxias in an official game for the 8th-finals of Copa do Brasil of 2011, the club entered the history of Brazilian soccer after beating the record for consecutive wins, replacing Palmeiras in 1996, who made 21 victories. With a win against Cianorte, ending the Campeonato Paranaense of 2011 unbeaten, and having thrashed Palmeiras 6–0 for the Copa do Brasil, Coritiba made 24 consecutive victories and 29 undefeated games.

Coritiba qualified in the 2011 Copa do Brasil final, after defeating Ceará. In the final, against Vasco da Gama, they were defeated 1–0 in the first leg, and won 3–2 in the second leg, but did not win the cup because of the away-goals rule.

In 2012, Coritiba won again the Campeonato Paranaense and were the three times champion. They were once again rated in the final of the Copa do Brasil. But, in the national tournament, they drew 2–1 against Palmeiras. Coritiba almost lost the first match 2–0, in Barueri.

Seasons in league since 2003

2003:5th A

2004:12th A

2005:19th A

2006:6th B

2007:1st B

2008:9th A

2009:17th A

2010:1st B

2011: 8th A

2012:13th A

2013:11th A

2014:13th A

2015:14th A

2016:15th A

2017:17th A

2018:10th B

2019:3rd B

2020:19th A

2021:3rd B

Club

Name
The current and official name of the city of Curitiba was established in 1919, ten years after the foundation of club, which was actually called Coritiba. Because of tradition, the club kept its original name along with the words "foot ball" and "club".

The name "Curitiba" had gone through many orthographies throughout history, such as Coritiba and Curityba due to cultural diversities throughout the city.

Colors and logo
The club colors are green and white, the colors of the Paraná state flag.
Founded on 12 October 1909, Coritiba is the oldest "green and white" team in Brazilian football. 

The club's logo is a green globe with the initials CFC in white across the centre, along with twelve white stylised pine seeds. The logo's colors, green and white, are the same as Paraná state flag's.
Coritiba's first logo was simple: a white background inside a green circle, with the initials CFC in green.

The team kit
Coritiba's first kit was used from 1909 to 1916, and was composed of green and white vertical stripes.
Coritiba's second kit, used from 1916 to 1976 was an all-white one.

The current home kit is composed of a white shirt, with two green parallel horizontal stripes and black shorts and white socks. The away kit is composed of a green and white vertical stripes shirt, black shorts and green socks. These kits were adopted in 1976.

Mascot
The club's mascot is an old man nicknamed Vovô Coxa (Grandpa Coxa), and represents the club's tradition of being the oldest football club of Curitiba.

Anthem
The official club anthem lyrics were composed by Cláudio Ribeiro, and the music by Homero Rébuli. An unofficial anthem exists, titled Coritiba Eterno Campeão (Coritiba the Eternal Champion), which was composed by Francis Night. A third anthem, with lyrics composed by Vinicius Coelho, with music by Sebastião Lima, is also called Eterno Campeão.

Market value
According to the 2014 ranking of BDO RCS Auditores Independentes consulting, Coritiba has the 13th highest market value of Brazilian football, valued at approximately R$118.5 million.

Other sports
Although best known for football, Coritiba is the first team in Southern Brazil who also support American football. With a partnership between Coritiba and the Barigui Crocodiles, the Coritiba Crocodiles were founded. Coritiba Crocodiles are the four times state champions, and two times Brazilian national league champions.

Honours

National
 Campeonato Brasileiro Série A: 1
1985

 Campeonato Brasileiro Série B: 2
2007, 2010

State
Campeonato Paranaense: 39
1916, 1927, 1931, 1933, 1935, 1939, 1941, 1942, 1946, 1947, 1951, 1952, 1954, 1956, 1957, 1959, 1960, 1968, 1969, 1971, 1972, 1973, 1974, 1975, 1976, 1978, 1979, 1986, 1989, 1999, 2003, 2004, 2008, 2010, 2011, 2012, 2013, 2017, 2022

Others
Torneio do Povo*: 1
1973
Note: The "Torneio do Povo" in 1973 had an official character but was only edition with an official character, the other editions of the tournament had no official character, are Friendlies.

Taça Cidade de Curitiba/Taça Clemente Comandulli: 2
1976, 1978

Friendly
Fita Azul Internacional: 1
1972

Curitiba International Summer Tournament (Curitiba, Brazil): 3
1968, 1970, 1971

Pierre Colon Trophy (Vichy, France): 1
1969

Akwaba Trophy (Abidjan, Ivory Coast): 1
1983

Festival Brasileiro de Futebol: 1
1997

Stadium

Estádio Couto Pereira is Coritiba's home stadium.

Name: Estádio Major Antônio Couto Pereira
Capacity: 37,182 
Address: Rua Ubaldino do Amaral, 37
Record attendance: (General) – 70,000 (Pope John Paul II, 1980) , (Game) – The stadium's attendance record in a football match currently stands at 65,943, set on May 15, 1983 when Atlético-PR played against Flamengo (2–0).
Field dimensions: 109,00m x 72,00m
Year opened: 1932

The stadium was founded as Belfort Duarte. Couto Pereira was the president of the club and he was responsible for the stadium being built. When he died in 1977, the stadium name was changed to Couto Pereira.

Rivalries
Coritiba's biggest rivals are from the same city: Atlético-PR and Paraná Clube. The games between Coritiba and Atlético-PR are called "Atlé-Tiba" whilst the games between Coritiba and Paraná are known as "Para-Tiba".

Current squad

First-team squad

Out on loan

Personnel

Current technical staff

Club records

Match Records

Other Records
First goal scorer: Fritz Essenfelter
Most appearances: 440 appearances by Jairo (1971–77), (1984–87).
Record goal scorer: 202 goals by Duílio Dias (1954–64).
Consecutive victories: Coritiba has the Guinness Book worldwide record of consecutive victories (24), achieved between February and May 2011.

Highest scores

Coritiba biggest victories

The 24 consecutive wins – 2011

Top attendances in Couto Pereira
 Coritiba 0–2 Flamengo, 58,311 people, 21 November 1983, Campeonato Brasileiro.
 Coritiba 2–0 Colorado-PR, 53,571 people, 16 September 1979, Campeonato Paranaense.
 Coritiba 3–0 Atlético-PR, 52,028 people, 1 May 1990, Campeonato Paranaense.
 Coritiba 1–0 Corinthians, 51,662 people, 11 May 1980, Campeonato Brasileiro.
 Coritiba 1–1 Vasco, 50,582 people, 12 December 1979, Campeonato Brasileiro.
 Coritiba 0–0 Atlético-PR, 47,307 people, 13 December 1978, Campeonato Paranaense.
 Coritiba 2–0 Paranavaí, 47,208 people, 23 March 2003, Campeonato Paranaense.
 Coritiba 0–0 Atlético-PR, 46,217 people, 10 December 1976, Campeonato Paranaense.
 Coritiba 2–2 Flamengo-RJ, 45,458 people, 9 November 1988, Campeonato Brasileiro.

Managers (1998 – present)

 Valdir Espinosa (1998)
 Darío Pereyra (1998)
 Mauro Fernandes (1999)
 Abel Braga (1999)
 Márcio Araújo (1999)
 Jair Pereira (2000)
 Lori Sandri (2000)
 Paquito (interim) (2000)
 Fito Neves (Aug 2000–Sept 00)
 Paquito (interim) (2000)
 Ivo Wortmann (Sept 2000–Aug 01)
 Ricardo Gomes (Aug 11, 2001 – Sept 21, 2001)
 Paulo Bonamigo (April 1, 2002 – Dec 15, 2003)
 Antônio Lopes (Dec 20, 2003 – May 5, 2005)
 Cuca (May 1, 2005 – Oct 11, 2005)
 Júnior Lopes (caretaker) (Oct 2005)
 Cláudio Marques (interim) (Oct 2005)
 Márcio Araújo (Oct 28, 2005 – Feb 24, 2006)
 Cláudio Marques (interim) (Feb 2006–March 6)
 Estevam Soares (March 2, 2006 – May 15, 2006)
 Paulo Bonamigo (May 14, 2006 – Dec 4, 2006)
 Guilherme Macuglia (Jan 19, 2007 – June 5, 2007)
 René Simões (June 6, 2007 – Dec 31, 2007)
 Dorival Júnior (Jan 4, 2008 – Dec 11, 2008)
 Ivo Wortmann (Dec 16, 2008 – April 20, 2009)
 René Simões (April 24, 2009 – Aug 10, 2009)
 Ney Franco (Aug 11, 2009 – Dec 1, 2010)
 Marcelo Oliveira (Jan 1, 2011 – Sept 6, 2012)
 Marquinhos Santos (Sept 6, 2012 – Sept 24, 2013)
 Péricles Chamusca (Sept 30, 2013 – Nov 16, 2013)
 Tcheco (interim) 2013)
 Dado Cavalcanti (2014)
 Celso Roth (2014)
 Marquinhos Santos (2014–15)
 Ney Franco (2015)
 Pachequinho (interim) (2015)
 Gilson Kleina (2016)
 Pachequinho (interim) (2016)
 Paulo César Carpegiani (2016–2017)
 Pachequinho (2017–)
 Marcelo Oliveira (2017)
 Sandro Forner (2018)
 Tcheco (2018)
 Argel Fucks (2018-2019)
 Matheus Costa (interim) 2019)
 Umberto Louzer (2019)
 Jorginho (2019)
 Eduardo Barroca (2020)
 Jorginho (2020)
 Rodrigo Santana (2020)
 Pachequinho (interim) 2020)
 Gustavo Morínigo (2021-2022)
 Guto Ferreira (2022-)

Past managers (1971–1997)

 1971 –  Tim
 1972 – Lanzoninho
 1973 –  Tim and Lanzoninho
 1974 –  Yustrich and  Hidalgo
 1975 – Hélio Alves and  Paulinho de Almeida
 1976 –  Dino Sani
 1977 – Lanzoninho
 1978 – Chiquinho
 1979 –  Dirceu Krüger,  Tim and Borba Filho
 1980 – Mário Juliato
 1981 –
 1982 –
 1983 –
 1984 – Dudú and  Dirceu Krüger
 1985 –  Dino Sani,  Dirceu Krüger and  Ênio Andrade
 1986 –  Dirceu Krüger and  Nicanor de Carvalho
 1987 –  Pedro Rocha and  Otacílio Gonçalves
 1988 –  Leão,  Dirceu Krüger and  Valdir Espinosa
 1989 –  Edu Coimbra and  Jair Picerni
 1990 –  Paulo César Carpegiani
 1991 –  Levir Culpi,  Sérgio Ramirez
 1992 –
 1993 – José Teixeira
 1994 –
 1995 –
 1996 –  Heron Ferreira,  Pepe,  Dirceu Krüger and  Lori Sandri
 1997 –  Rubens Minelli and  Dirceu Krüger

Players

Greats squads of Coritiba
Some magazines polled for the best Coritiba team of all time, composed of the best Coritiba players of all time. Only two players were present in all polls, Fedato and Miltinho. Jairo, Hildago, Nilo, Krügger and Zé Roberto appear in two of three lists:

 Grandes Times Brasileiros (1971)  Joel – Tonico, Fedato, Pescuma, Carazzai – Miltinho, Hidalgo, Tião Abatiá – Baby, Ivo, Ronald

 Lance! – Especial (2005)  Jairo – Hermes, Fedato, Oberdan, Nilo – Miltinho, Hidalgo, Alex, Krügger – Zé Roberto, Aladim

 Placar – Especial (2009) Jairo – Ninho, Fedato, Pizzatinho, Nilo – Miltinho, Zé Roberto, Krügger – Lela, Duílio, Pachequinho

Kit manufacturers
 Adidas (1979–87)
 Arcal (1988–88)
 Campeã (1989–91)
 Umbro (1992–96)
 Penalty (1997–05)
 Diadora (2006–08)
 Lotto (2008–11)
 Nike (2012–16)
 Adidas (2016-17)
 1909  (2018-present)

Shirt sponsors

References

External links

Official Site
Blog do Torcedor do Coritiba – Official Supporter's Blog (in Portuguese and English)
Coxanautas (in Portuguese)
Império Alviverde (in Portuguese)

 
Association football clubs established in 1909
Football clubs in Paraná (state)
Sport in Curitiba
1909 establishments in Brazil
Campeonato Brasileiro Série A winning clubs